Vodochody is a municipality and village in Prague-East District in the Central Bohemian Region of the Czech Republic. It has about 700 inhabitants.

Administrative parts
The village of Hoštice is an administrative part of Vodochody.

Economy
In the municipal territory there is a small airport, Vodochody Airport. It serves to the aircraft construction company Aero Vodochody, which is located in neighbouring Odolena Voda.

References

Villages in Prague-East District